Lucius Fox is a character appearing in American comic books published by DC Comics, commonly in association with the superhero Bruce Wayne / Batman. He is Bruce Wayne's business manager at Wayne Enterprises who runs the business interests that supply his equipment needs as well as financing his operations, and is the father of Luke Fox / Batwing, Tiffany Fox / Batgirl, and Jace Fox / Batman.

Lucius Fox has been featured in various media adaptations. The character was voiced by Brock Peters in Batman: The Animated Series, Mel Winkler in The New Batman Adventures, Louis Gossett Jr. in The Batman, Phil LaMarr in DC Super Hero Girls, and Dave Fennoy in the video game Batman: Arkham Knight. Lucius Fox made his live-action debut in The Dark Knight Trilogy, portrayed by Morgan Freeman, with Chris Chalk portraying him in the television series Gotham, and Simon Manyonda portraying a young version of Chalk's Lucius Fox in the second and third seasons of the television series Pennyworth. Mark Edward Taylor portrays an Irish Catholic substitute of the character named Jack Fox O'Dwyer in the DC Extended Universe (DCEU) film Batman v Superman: Dawn of Justice.

Publication history
Lucius Fox was created by writer Len Wein and penciller John Calnan and first appeared in Batman #307 (January 1979).

Fictional character biography
As CEO and President of Wayne Enterprises, Lucius Fox is one of Bruce Wayne's closest allies. He is an experienced businessman, entrepreneur, and inventor who unknowingly runs the business interests that supply weapons, gadgets, vehicles, and armor for Bruce Wayne to use when he fights crime as the vigilante Batman. The character is depicted as being aware that Bruce Wayne is Batman, having replaced Alfred Pennyworth in cave operations, after Alfred's untimely death at the hands of Bane.

Business career
Lucius Fox is regarded as having the "Midas Touch", an ability to turn failing businesses into successful conglomerates, and is consequently a highly sought-after businessman throughout the corporate world. Fox is called in to the failing Wayne Enterprises and brings balance to both Bruce Wayne's private and business finances. In Batman Confidential, he is shown heading the project that produced the prototype that would become the Batwing. He also manages the particulars of the Wayne Foundation while Bruce dictates the organization's general policies. Since then, Fox has been approached repeatedly by other companies seeking his expertise. After overcoming the original challenge of returning Wayne Enterprises to its former glory, Fox has elected to stay, having been given an unparalleled freedom in the company.

In Batman: Haunted Knight, it is explained that a young Bruce Wayne rescued Lucius Fox from muggers in Paris. Later, Fox asked him if he wants to start a foundation for charity, to which Bruce agrees many years later, deciding that not all of his money has to go to crime fighting.

Bruce Wayne, as Batman, originally forms the Outsiders to rescue Fox from Baron Bedlam.  When Fox later suffers a stroke, Bruce makes sure that Fox gets the best care possible and supports him and his family.

Family life
With his wife Tanya, Lucius has several children, all introduced in the comics at different stages over the years. Fox's daughter Tam is introduced in Red Robin. Her father sends her to personally locate Tim Drake, only to discover his secret identity as Red Robin and become involved in his conflicts with the League of Assassins. For a time it was believed Fox was dead, but this was a ruse to help combat his enemies. It is believed that learning Drake's secrets has led Tam Fox to realize that Bruce Wayne is Batman. However, she apparently did not report her findings to her father.

Fox's youngest daughter, Tiffany, was first shown in Batman #308 (1979), but was not substantially explored until 2011's The New 52 reboot of DC's continuity, which reintroduced her along with her siblings in Batwing #22. The alternative future story shown in Batgirl: Futures End (2014) shows Tiffany grows up to be a gifted protege of Barbara Gordon, becoming one of several women to use the Batgirl moniker, with a pink-accented Batsuit.

Prior to The New 52, Lucius had a son named Timothy whose occasional delinquency embarrassed his father. Tim, now calling himself 'Jace' returns in the Infinite Frontier miniseries The Next Batman: Second Son. Lucius also has a son named Lucas "Luke" Fox, introduced in the New 52 continuity, who is an intellectual prodigy and mixed martial artist and who, unbeknownst to his father, was selected and trained by Bruce Wayne to become the vigilante known as Batwing using a high-tech Batsuit designed by his father. Both Luke and his predecessor as Batwing, David Zavimbe, are agents of the international crime-fighting organization Batman Incorporated.

After Bruce Wayne announces his public support for Batman Inc., Fox becomes active supplying him with the company's resources and research prototypes.

Alternative versions

Anti-Matter Universe
An alternate version of Fox is shown in the Antimatter universe (where the Crime Syndicate resides). In this universe, Fox is a white gang boss who has the backing of the CSA, in return for spreading fear in Gotham City and snitching for Owlman.

Batman Beyond

In the comic book series Batman Beyond, Lucius' son, Lucius Fox Jr., serves as a supporting character. He merged his company, Foxteca, with Wayne Enterprises as Wayne Incorporated, and becomes Wayne's business partner.

Batman: Earth One

In the graphic novel Batman: Earth One, by Geoff Johns and Gary Frank, Fox is a 22-year-old intern at Wayne Medical, hoping to develop an advanced prosthetic for his 5-year-old niece. After repairing Bruce Wayne's grapnel, he deduces that Batman is the billionaire after seeing the vigilante using the same device on the news. Believing that Wayne's crusade is for noble intentions, Fox accepts his role as an equipment developer for Batman and begins making some batarangs for him afterwards. As of Volume Two, Fox is promoted as head of Wayne Enterprises' Research and Development; he provides Wayne an armored Batsuit and is tasked to build the Batmobile.

Convergence

During the Convergence storyline, Pre-Crisis Gotham City is trapped under a mysterious dome. Fox allies himself with the visiting Superman and Supergirl, who had been depowered. With assistance from S.T.A.R. Labs, the trio rebuild the Phantom Zone projector in a somewhat successful effort to break through the dome and help the trapped citizens of Gotham. Their efforts are threatened by the Phantom Zone criminals and an invading homicidal simian army.

Injustice 2

During the prequel storyline of the video game Injustice 2, it is revealed before Lex Luthor's death at the hands of Superman during his suicide mission, then Superman's defeat, Lucius was called by Lex to give a message to Batman, such as their victory against Superman is finally near, despite Lex's noble sacrifice, with his fortunes are now under Batman's hand since Superman took away most of the Wayne family fortunes from him. Sometimes after Superman's defeat, Lucius precedes Luthor's wish for Batman.

In other media

Television

Animation
 Lucius Fox appears in the DC Animated Universe, voiced by Brock Peters in Batman: The Animated Series and Mel Winkler in The New Batman Adventures. He appears not to know about Bruce's alter ego throughout the series. His largest role is in the two-part episode "Feat of Clay", where Matt Hagen attempts to kill him under the guise of Bruce Wayne and under orders of Roland Daggett.
 In an early episode of Batman Beyond, "Black Out", Lucius Fox has a son, Lucius Jr., who does not appear in the TV series. In a conversation between Bruce Wayne and the villainous Derek Powers, it is revealed that Lucius Jr. was a vice president of Wayne Enterprises before Powers took over the company and fired him. This caused Lucius Jr. to form his own technology company, Foxteca, which soon becomes a target of corporate sabotage by Inque, acting under Powers' direction. Bruce warns Powers to stop the sabotage, as the Fox family have long-standing ties to the Waynes.

 Lucius Fox appears in The Batman, voiced by Louis Gossett Jr. This version of the character is based on the version from Christopher Nolan's Dark Knight Trilogy, being an old friend of Bruce Wayne's father, and knowing Bruce's secret identity as Batman. He helped design most of his arsenal along with the construction of the Batcave beneath Wayne Manor.
 Lucius Fox appears in DC Super Hero Girls, voiced by Phil LaMarr. This version is a teacher at Super Hero High.
 Lucius Fox appears in Harley Quinn, voiced again by Phil LaMarr. He appears in the season 2 episode "Batman's Back Man", when Bruce tasks him with building a high-tech Batsuit to compensate for injuries he sustained in the season one finale.

Live-action
 A younger Lucius Fox appears in Gotham, portrayed by Chris Chalk. He first appears in "The Anvil or the Hammer" where he is introduced to a young Bruce Wayne by corrupt Wayne Enterprises executive Sid Bunderslaw. He tells Bruce about his father being "a very guarded man" and "a true Stoic" before sending him on his way. This clue helps Bruce discover his father's secret life. Fox later reappeared in the show's second season and is asked by Bruce to fix the computer Alfred destroyed with Wayne Enterprises' secrets and research. Fox confirmed that the computer can be fixed but it will take a while. In "Rise of the Villains: Worse Than a Crime," Lucius Fox emerges from the secret room to tell Bruce and Alfred that he fixed the computer only to find them not there and that there were signs of a struggle. Lucius reports them missing to Captain Nathaniel Barnes who makes an exception to the "file a missing persons report in 24 hours" part. When it was revealed that Alfred had been brought in by the police, Lucius was present when Alfred mentioned that he was attacked by Tabitha Galavan while voicing his suspicion that Theo Galavan is responsible. Edward Nygma later tipped off Lucius Fox, Alfred Pennyworth, and Harvey Bullock on where James Gordon is recuperating. While Gordon, Bullock, Pennyworth, Oswald Cobblepot's gang, and Selina Kyle went to rescue Bruce Wayne from Theo Galavan and the Order of St. Dumas, Lucius tipped off Nathaniel Barnes on where Bruce Wayne can be found. In "Wrath of the Villains: Mr. Freeze," James Gordon and Harvey Bullock meet with Lucius Fox at a diner and ask him about any cryogenic research done by Wayne Enterprises. He tells them that Wayne Enterprises did some cryogenic research until Thomas Wayne shut it down for reasons that Lucius was not informed about. In "Mad City: Better to Reign in Hell...," Lucius Fox has left Wayne Enterprises and has become a science expert at the Gotham City Police Department. During season 5, Lucius continues to help with the GCPD after it becomes a No Man’s Land following Ra’s Al Ghul’s attack. In "A Dark Knight: A Beautiful Darkness", Lucius reveals that he is a black belt in Jiu-jitsu, having taken night classes. Before Bruce confronts Bane and saves Gotham City, he meets with Lucius Fox who has plenty of new gadgets to give the budding vigilante. One of them is next-generation stealth-tech that functions as a beacon to bats. Lucius dubs it fittingly enough the "Nightwing Project." In the series finale, Bruce returns after 10 years of training abroad. Lucius is recruited by Bruce to design a suit and gadgets to begin a crusade as the vigilante, Batman. Lucius and Alfred agree to keep Batman’s identity secret and help Bruce however they can.
 An even younger version of this iteration of Lucius Fox appears in Pennyworth, portrayed by Simon Manyonda. Introduced in the second season as a scientist affiliate of Thomas Wayne's who works for the CIA to infiltrate the Raven Union, he later becomes a member of the English League.
 Lucius Fox is featured in Batwoman, portrayed by Domonique Adam. He is mentioned by his son to have died five years prior to the start of the show. In the episode "A Narrow Escape," it was revealed that Tommy Elliot targeted Lucius Fox for his Wayne Enterprises journals. The hitman, former police officer and current Crows agent Miguel Robles, shot Lucius at a convenience store and covered it up for years until Luke and his allies solved the case and busted him. When Magpie procures one of the journals from Tommy's gangster contact Johnny Sabatino for Alice, Mouse discovers that it is written in codes. By "A Secret Kept from All the Rest," Alice and Mouse were able to decipher the codes that would take down Batman upon obtaining Lucius Fox's special glasses. When Luke was shot by Russell Tavaroff at the end of "And Justice for All" and ended up in a purgatory state as seen in "Armed and Dangerous", Lucius was partially seen by the window in a pondering state as a subconscious manifestation of Bruce Wayne gave Luke the choice of living or dying. Before Luke awoke from his coma, Lucius briefly turned toward Luke.
 The episode "Mad As a Hatter" introduces an A.I. version of Lucius Fox (voiced by Donny Lucas). While working on perfecting the Batwing suit, Luke discovered the A.I. version of his father in the Batwing helmet through dumb luck as it states that Lucius programmed it to help Luke out. By the season finale titled "We Having Fun Yet?", the Lucius Fox A.I. takes control of the Batblimp to pilot it to a desolate part of Gotham City so that the Joker acid wouldn't hit anyone. Before Batwing leaves the Batblimp as the A.I. sacrifices itself, the Lucius Fox A.I. states that he is proud of Luke and to protect Gotham City.

Film

Live-action

The Dark Knight Trilogy

 In Batman Begins, Lucius Fox was portrayed by Morgan Freeman. Fox is a research head and friend of Bruce Wayne's late father Thomas Wayne who is demoted by Wayne Enterprises CEO William Earle to the Applied Sciences division, which involves overseeing the supplies of Wayne Enterprises' aborted research projects and prototypes. Upon returning to the business, Bruce Wayne strikes up a fast friendship which allows him to all but recruit Fox as his armorer for his Batman activities. Fox proves valuable in this role, even when he is fired by Earle. Regarding Bruce's identity as Batman, he tells Bruce, "[If] you don't want to tell me exactly what you're doing— when I'm asked, I don't have to lie. But don't think of me as an idiot." Fox later discovers Bruce's real identity through Alfred Pennyworth, who calls upon Fox to Bruce's rescue after he is assaulted by Scarecrow's fear toxin. At the end of the film, Bruce, having gained majority control of Wayne Enterprises' shares, fires Earle and makes Fox the company's CEO.
 In The Dark Knight, with Freeman reprising his role, it's acknowledged that Fox is fully aware of Bruce's secret identity as Batman, though it is never openly stated by either of them, so that he can retain plausible deniability if an outsider puts two and two together. Fox actively participates in a support capacity as Bruce's armorer, designing a new Batsuit designed for more efficient mobility and which can withstand against dogs, though also makes Bruce vulnerable to knives and gunfire. When Wayne Enterprises negotiates a deal with Lau, an investment holdings owner who also is an accountant for the Gotham mafia, both Bruce and Fox look at the books and decide that Lau's business is illegal based on their profits. With Harvey Dent and Lt. James Gordon needing Lau alive to find where he has hidden the mob's money, Bruce makes a trip to Hong Kong and Fox accompanies him to make it look like they've only gone there to cancel the negotiations with Lau's investment company. When Batman uses Fox's cell phone sonar technology to create a computer system that can spy on the whole city to find Joker, Fox says that he will help just this once, but will resign immediately afterward. After the police arrest the Joker, Fox types his name into the system as instructed by Batman and the computer self-destructs. Fox walks away smiling, evidently having withdrawn his threat to resign.
 In The Dark Knight Rises, with Freeman once again reprising his role, Fox is the president of a nearly bankrupt Wayne Enterprises, with Wayne Enterprises board member Miranda Tate taking over the role of chairman and CEO. He brings the reclusive Bruce up to speed on the poor state of the company's finances, which have all but evaporated after heavy investment in an aborted fusion reactor project failed to pay off thanks to John Daggett. Fox shows Bruce around the Applied Sciences division once again, "for old time's sake," introducing him to the new airborne vehicle he has nicknamed "The Bat", in addition to other new gadgets he has developed. After Bane takes over Gotham City, Fox spends much of the intervening three-month period hiding in Wayne Enterprises property with fellow employees. Bane and his men raid Wayne Enterprises and kill the special forces soldiers that infiltrated Gotham City while rounding up the Wayne Enterprises employees to await judgement at Scarecrow's show trial. When Batman returns, he lets himself get captured as Bruce Wayne so that Selina Kyle can sneak in, knock out the guards and break Fox out. Fox attempts to help him disarm the newly weaponized fusion core, waiting in the reactor chamber for it to be returned by Batman. Miranda Tate, who was responsible for the project in the first place, reveals herself to be Talia al Ghul as she floods the chamber to make re-installment of the core impossible. Fox manages to escape. After Batman tows the core away from Gotham and it detonates at sea, Bruce Wayne is thought by Fox to be dead and his estate is divided to cover his debts, with the remainder being given to Alfred Pennyworth, except for Wayne Manor. While researching ways he could have fixed "The Bat"'s autopilot, Fox learns that Bruce fixed it himself six months earlier. He then realizes that Bruce is still alive.

DC Extended Universe
 In the original script of Batman v Superman: Dawn of Justice, subtitled World's Finest, Fox was originally set to make an appearance. His death and the destruction of Wayne Enterprises during Superman's fight with General Zod would have brought Batman from his retirement back to his fight against crime. In the final film, Fox's role is replaced by the Irish Catholic Director of Wayne Financial Jack Fox O'Dwyer (portrayed by Mark Edward Taylor).

Animation
 Kevin Michael Richardson voices Lucius Fox in Batman: Gotham Knight (which takes place between Batman Begins and The Dark Knight) within the segment "Field Test". The segment confirms that Lucius still does not know Batman's secret identity. An accident involving a new WayneCom satellite's gyroscopic electromagnetic guidance system gives Fox an idea to create a device with the satellite's gyro with an advanced sound sensor that will electromagnetically deflect small-arms fire. Bruce Wayne takes the device and attends a charity golf tournament being held by developer Ronald Marshall. After breaking up a fight between Sal Maroni's mob and the Russian Mafia which resulted in one of the operatives being injured by the device, Batman returns the device to Fox, stating, "... it works too well. I'm willing to put my life on the line to do what I have to. But it has to be mine, no one else's."
 Fox appears in the film Batman: Bad Blood, voiced by Ernie Hudson. There, his son suspects that Wayne Enterprises might be connected to Batman where it was most likely that they build tech for him. When he confronts his father, the two are interrupted by Damian Wayne's clone Heretic and his gang. Lucius is forced to let them into the vault containing Bat Tech with Luke held hostage and is stabbed by Heretic afterwards. He spends the rest of the movie in a hospital only waking up during the final scenes of the movie.

Video games 
 Morgan Freeman reprised his role as Lucius Fox in the Batman Begins video game.
 Lucius Fox appears in DC Universe Online, voiced by Leif Anders.
 Fox appears in Injustice 2, voiced again by Phil LaMarr. He is part of Bruce Wayne's efforts to rebuild Metropolis and Gotham City after Superman's Regime, and encourages Bruce to widen his circle of trust as he cannot be alone in his efforts.
 Lucius Fox is a playable character in the Nintendo DS version of Lego Batman and his pieces can be found in the character creation feature in the others consoles version of the game.
 Lucius Fox appears in Gotham Knights, voiced by Peter Jay Fernandez. This version left Wayne Enterprises to start his own company, Foxteca, but nonetheless remains an important ally of Batman and his protégés.

Batman: Arkham 

 Fox appears in Batman: Arkham Knight, voiced by Dave Fennoy. He appears throughout different times in the story assisting with Batman's technical needs. Batman can even visit him at Wayne Tower. He also appears in the "Friend in Need" side-quest where he is captured by Hush (disguised as Bruce Wayne) before being saved by Batman. In the DLC content it is revealed that following the alleged death of Bruce Wayne, Lucius now owns all of Wayne Enterprises.

Batman: The Telltale Series 

 Lucius Fox appears in Batman: The Telltale Series, with Dave Fennoy reprising the role from the Arkham series. Like the comics, he is an employee at Wayne Enterprises and the main supply for many of Batman's gadgets and tech. He is also fully aware that Bruce Wayne is the vigilante, having sided with him to help make the city safer for his children. When the Wayne Enterprises board removes Bruce as CEO and replaces him with Oswald Cobblepot, he can either leave to continue working on Batman's tech or stay to keep an eye on the criminal. Lucius also helps Bruce track down the Children of Arkham after they kidnap Alfred.
 Lucius appears in the sequel Batman: The Enemy Within, voiced again by Dave Fennoy. Lucius' daughter Tiffany (voiced by Valarie Rae Miller) starts working at Wayne Enterprises and Lucius tries suggesting to Bruce that she could be a valuable ally. Bruce asks a favor of Lucius to decode the meaning of a puzzle from Riddler. The puzzle turns out to be a homing signal leading to Lucius being killed when a missile hits his office. His death leaves many shaken, Bruce becomes more determined to stop Riddler, Alfred's already fragile mental state is put under further strain, and Tiffany desperately searches for clarity as to why her father died. In episode 5, it is revealed that Riddler was killed by Tiffany so that she can avenge her father's death. Depending on the player's choices if she doesn't know the truth, she can either be sent to prison without talking to her, or leave Gotham with the Agency. If she does know the truth, she will either sever all ties with Bruce and go into hiding to avoid arrest or she will happily join Bruce in becoming his new sidekick and inventor while atoning for her crime on his terms.

References

External links
 Lucius Fox at DC Comics' official website

Black people in comics
Black characters in films
Batman characters
Fictional business executives
Fictional African-American people
Fictional chemical engineers
Fictional software engineers
Fictional inventors
Comics characters introduced in 1979
Fictional managers
Characters created by Len Wein
DC Comics film characters
DC Comics male characters
DC Comics scientists
DC Comics television characters
Gotham City Police Department officers
Male characters in film
Male characters in television